Manuel González (born 1 January 1963) is a Spanish sprinter. He competed in the men's 4 × 400 metres relay at the 1984 Summer Olympics.

References

1963 births
Living people
Athletes (track and field) at the 1984 Summer Olympics
Spanish male sprinters
Olympic athletes of Spain
Place of birth missing (living people)
Mediterranean Games medalists in athletics